The Philippines men's national water polo team represents the Philippines in international men's water polo competitions and friendly matches. It is currently under the management of Philippine Swimming, Inc. (PSI).

Results

Major tournaments

Competitive record

FINA Challengers' Cup
 2009 - 4th place
 2019 - 5th place

Asian Games
 1954 - 6th place
 1958 - 5th place
 2006 - 6th place

Asian Swimming Championships
 2014 - Withdrew

Asian Cup
 2013 - 5th place

Southeast Asian Games
 2005 -  Silver medal
 2007 -  Silver medal
 2009 -  Silver medal
 2011 -  Silver medal
 2013 - Did not participate
 2015 - 5th place
 2017 - 4th place
 2019 -  Silver medal

Minor tournaments

Arafura Sports Festival
 1993 -  Silver medal

Team

Current squad
Roster for the 2019 Southeast Asian Games

 Mummar Alamara
 Abnel Amiladjid
 Mico Anota
 Romark Johnson Belo
 Teodoro Roy Cañete Jr.
 Tani Gomez Jr.
 Adan Gonzales
 Macgyver Reyes
 Reynaldo Salonga Jr.
 Juan Paolo Serrano
 Vincent Sicat
 Mark Jerwin Valdez
 Matthew Royce Yu

References

External Links
 Official Facebook Page

Water Polo
Men's national water polo teams
National water polo teams in Asia
National water polo teams by country